The NYSE Composite (^NYA) is a stock market index covering all common stock listed on the New York Stock Exchange, including American depositary receipts, real estate investment trusts, tracking stocks, and foreign listings. It includes corporations in each of the ten industries listed in the Industry Classification Benchmark. It uses free-float market cap weighting.

Over 2,000 stocks are covered in the index, of which over 1,600 are from United States corporations and over 360 are foreign listings; however foreign companies are very prevalent among the largest companies in the index: of the 100 companies in the index having the largest market capitalization (and thus the largest impact on the index), more than half (55) are non-U.S. issues.

The index was originally given a value of 50 points, based on the market closing on December 31, 1965, and is weighted by the number of shares listed for each issue. It was re-introduced in January 2003 with a value of 5,000 points. The NYSE Composite outperformed the Dow Jones Industrial Average, the Nasdaq Composite, and the S&P 500 in 2004, 2005, and 2006 and closed above the 10,000 level for the first time on June 1, 2007. The NYSE Composite set a closing high of 10,311.61 on October 31, 2007 but failed to pass the intra-day high of 10,387.17 it reached in trading on October 11, 2007. On September 29, 2008, continuing troubles in the financial sector culminated in a loss of more than 8%. On November 20, 2008, the index plummeted below 5,000 to a multi-year bear market low near 4,650. Its lifetime low (as currently calculated) stands at 347.77 points, reached in October 1974.

After a gradual and volatile recovery since 2009, the index finally set fresh nominal records at the end of 2013, closing at an all-time high of 10,406.77 on December 31.

In addition to the overall composite, there are separate indices for industrial, transportation, utility, and financial corporations.

Record values

Annual returns

See also
 NASDAQ Composite
 Value Line Composite Index

Notes

External links
 NYSE Composite index level and data from nyse.com
 Yahoo! Finance page for ^NYA
 Bloomberg page for NYA:IND
 Terms page on nyse.com (archive)
 Composite methodology
 NYSE Composite official brochure
 Reuters page for .NYA

Composite
American stock market indices